Endemol B.V. was a Dutch-based media company that produced and distributed multiplatform entertainment content. The company annually produced more than 15,000 hours of programming across scripted and non-scripted genres, including drama, reality TV, comedy, game shows, entertainment, factual and children's programming.

Endemol, a global network of operations in more than 30 countries, worked with over 300 broadcasters, digital platforms and licensees worldwide. The business covered development, production, marketing, distribution, franchise management and multi-platform initiatives including digital video, gaming and apps.

Endemol was merged into Endemol Shine Group (a joint-venture between The Walt Disney Company and Apollo Global Management) and headquartered in the Netherlands in 2015. Since the merger, Endemol is an in-name-only unit of Endemol Shine Group, and in the next years, Endemol's iconic eye logo was replaced with Endemol Shine Group's wordmark-only logo in the closing credits of most of the shows that it licensed. Endemol created and ran reality, talent and game show franchises worldwide, including Big Brother, Deal or No Deal, Fear Factor, Wipeout, The Money Drop, and Your Face Sounds Familiar. The company also has a portfolio of drama and comedy series including titles such as The Fall, Peaky Blinders, Hell on Wheels, Benidorm, Ripper Street, Black Mirror, Bad Education, My Mad Fat Diary, Hot in Cleveland, Kirstie, Leverage, Home and Away, Death Comes to Pemberley and The Crimson Field.

History 
Endemol was founded in 1994 by a merger of television production companies owned by Joop van den Ende and John de Mol, the name deriving from the combination of their surnames.

Endemol has specialised in formatted programming that can be adapted for different countries around the world as well as different media platforms. One notable success has been the Big Brother reality television show, with versions in many countries after the initial Dutch version. Other examples include Deal or No Deal (sold to over 75 countries), The Money Drop (sold in over 50 countries), Fear Factor (sold in 30 countries) and Wipeout (sold in over 30 countries). From 2011 till its absorption by Endemol Shine Group, the company expanded its English language drama output with shows such as The Fall, Peaky Blinders, Ripper Street and Black Mirror in the UK and Hell on Wheels in the USA. In November 2013 the company launched Endemol Beyond, an international division specialising in original content for digital video platforms such as YouTube.

In 2000, Endemol was sold to the Spanish telecom and media corporation Telefónica for €5.5 billion. In November 2005, 25% of Endemol was taken public, and since was listed on the Euronext Amsterdam exchange under the stock symbol EML. On 14 May 2007 the remaining 75% of Endemol shares were bought by a consortium, Edam Acquisition, led by Mediaset, the company controlled by Silvio Berlusconi's family, and including the investment company Cyrte, in which the original co-founder John de Mol has shares. The consortium announced on 6 August 2007 that it now owned 99.54% of Endemol shares, after an offer to buy the remaining shares went through on 3 August 2007; it asked the Euronext bourse for a delisting of Endemol.

It was reported in 2010 that the company was $3 billion in debt. Then in 2011, it was reported that the debt had grown to $4.1 billion.

A loan restructure was planned for 2011 when Endemol was expected to breach its debt covenants. On 30 June, the debt covenants were breached at the same time that CEO Ynon Kreiz left the company and Endemol's UK subsidiary failed to file its annual accounts. On 23 March 2012, Endemol's debt was converted into shares by US private-equity firm Apollo Global Management. On 3 April 2012, Mediaset sold its majority stake in Endemol to Apollo and Dutch asset manager Cyrte, and Endemol restructured the bulk of its debt. The current CEO is Just Spee. On 15 May 2014, Apollo and 21st Century Fox announced a joint venture to combine 21st Century Fox's Shine Group and Apollo's Endemol and CORE Media Group. The deal closed October 2014.

Over the years Endemol has expanded its international presence either by starting up operations in new markets or by acquiring existing production companies. Most recently, in December 2013, Endemol became a shareholder in Israel's Channel 2 franchisee Reshet, following the acquisition in April of a controlling share in the Israeli independent producer Kuperman, which is now Endemol Israel.

On 17 December 2014, Endemol merged with fellow Apollo Global Management subsidiary Core Media, producer of American Idol, and 21st Century Fox's Shine unit, with the resulting 'mega-indie' adopting the name "Endemol Shine Group", which was a 50:50 joint venture by both parent companies. The name took effect on 1 January 2015. 21st Century Fox's predecessor company, Rupert Murdoch's News Corporation, had in 2011 bought Shine (founder and chairperson until the 2015 merger: Murdoch's daughter Elisabeth) for $673 million.

Global presence 

Endemol has the following operations around the world:

Endemol USA 

Endemol USA is the United States production branch of Endemol based in Los Angeles, California. It has been in operation since 2000. The branch produces Endemol's popular worldwide formats for the major American TV networks, such as Fear Factor, Deal or No Deal and 1 Vs. 100 for NBC; Extreme Makeover: Home Edition, Show Me the Money, The One: Making a Music Star, Set for Life, and Wipeout for ABC; Exposed for MTV; Big Brother and Kid Nation for CBS; Midnight Money Madness for TBS (under the moniker Lock and Key Productions) and most recently, a game show adaptation of 20Q for GSN. Their worst faring franchise by far is The One which was canceled after four episodes. Fear Factor was canceled after six seasons and was later revived for an additional season by NBC in 2011; a new version began airing on MTV in 2017. Another one of their shows, Big Brother has two seasons already out on DVD. While Big Brother has had the most international success to date, their most successful USA program could end up being either Deal or No Deal or Extreme Makeover: Home Edition. Both programs are wildly popular and highly rated.

Endemol USA created Midnight Money Madness for cable's TBS network, in which viewers can call in to play games and win money prizes. It is based on Endemol's successful Participation TV format. On 13 October 2006, Endemol USA launched another game show for NBC, 1 vs. 100 with Bob Saget, and debuted as another ratings winner. And on 14 November 2006, ABC premiered Show Me the Money, with William Shatner as its host. Midnight Money Madness was canceled in October 2006 after 32 episodes, in which its successor, Take the Cake, premiered 9 July 2007, and Show Me the Money was canceled in December 2006 after only five episodes aired. A syndicated version of Deal or No Deal aired from 2008 to 2010 (the show was revived for CNBC in 2018), while Wipeout aired from 2008 to 2015 on ABC.In October 2008, Tokyo Broadcasting System filed a lawsuit against ABC (with a separate suit against Endemol pending) for claims that Wipeout copied elements from two of their popular shows, Takeshi's Castle (known as MXC in the USA) and Sasuke (better known in the US as Ninja Warrior). Endemol USA also produces the Style Network hour-long reality series Jerseylicious, which debuted in 2010.

In June 2010, Endemol picked up the distribution rights to the TV Land sitcom "Hot in Cleveland", which it will distribute internationally. This marked the first time that Endemol has acquired an American-produced scripted series. Other scripted properties that Endemol also owns rights to include Happily Divorced and The Exes, also airing on TV Land.

In 2011, Endemol expanded its US production portfolio to include more non-reality fare, starting with The Steve Harvey Show, distributed by NBCUniversal Television Distribution. The hour-long talk/variety program premiered on 10 September 2012 in syndication, and ran for five seasons before being replaced by a similarly-titled show that is produced by IMG. Another program, the mob-related crime drama Red Widow, aired on ABC as a mid-season replacement in the 2012-2013 television season.

Endemol USA Latino, which produces Endemol USA's successful shows in Spanish language as shown on the major Hispanic TV networks. Their first production was Vas o No Vas based on the popular Deal or No Deal, which aired on Telemundo. Unlike Endemol USA's headquarters in Los Angeles, Endemol USA Latino has headquarters located in Miami, Florida.

Endemol USA owns True Entertainment and majority stakes in the production companies Authentic Entertainment, 51 Minds Entertainment, and Original Media.

At the 2015 Digital Content NewFronts, Endemol Beyond announced new channels Looksy and Smasher.

Authentic Entertainment, LLC

In 2010-08-10, Endemol B.V. announced the acquisition of a majority share of Authentic Entertainment Inc. by Endemol North America, with unverified reports claiming the deal worth US$60–70 million.

True Entertainment/Truly Original
Through its New York City subsidiary True Entertainment it produced The Real Housewives of Atlanta, Catch It Keep It, A Baby Story, Whose Wedding Is It Anyway?, Mystery Diagnosis, The Robert Verdi Show, The A-List: New York, Make Room for Multiples, and Fashion Queens.

Earlier shows include Personal Conviction, Rebuilt: The Human Body Shop, A World Away, Band in a Bubble, Married Away, Mystery Medicine, Under One Roof, What's Your Sign Design?, HGTV Design Star, Unwrapping Macy's, Widow on the Hill, Operation Homecoming: Writing the Wartime Experience, Go Ahead, Make My Dinner!, Town Haul, Guess Who's Coming To Decorate, B. Smith Style, The Good Buy Girls, The Gastineau Girls, and Town Haul Jeffersonville.

True Entertainment was founded in 2000 and by Steven Weinstock and Glenda Hersh both of whom had previously worked for The New York Times subsidiary NYT Television.

In 2003-09-30, Endemol announced the acquisition of a 51% stake in New York-based True Entertainment, with the acquired company continue to be managed by the founding partners, Glenda Hersh and Steven Weinstock.

In 2014, Glenda Hersh and business partner Steven Weinstock's True Entertainment took over Original Media.

In 2017, True Entertainment and sister company Original Media merged to form Truly Original.

51 Minds Entertainment

Endemol UK 

Originally known as Broadcast Communications, Endemol UK is one of the UK's longest established production groups and won its first television commissions in the mid-1980s. It produces the main Endemol franchises such as Big Brother and Deal or No Deal.

Endemol India 
In January 2006, Endemol started producing programs with Mohit Raina in different channels which are in Hindi, Telugu, Tamil, Kannada, Malayalam and Bengali from Mumbai, India. For various media company's channels were Sony Pictures Networks India, Disney Star, Sun TV Network, Zee Entertainment Enterprises, Viacom 18, NDTV Imagine, Mazhavil Manorama

Endemol Australia 

Endemol Australia (formerly "Endemol Southern Star") is an Australian production company which was previously a joint venture of Endemol and Southern Star Group. Endemol purchased Southern Star Group from Fairfax Media in January 2009. It produces Endemol's popular worldwide formats for Australia, including Big Brother, Deal or No Deal, and Ready Steady Cook. It is based in Australia.

Lawsuits 
Endemol sued Brazilian channel SBT over what it says was a Big Brother copycat, and threatened to sue Russian Behind the Glass for the same reason.

Endemol was sued by four Georgia women alleging that a text-message game featured on Deal or No Deal is a form of illegal gambling.

Productions

Reality television 

 Auction Kings (produced by Endemol subsidiary Authentic Entertainment)
 Big Brother
 Secret Story (Version of Big Brother, exclusively for TF1, France, TVI, Portugal, and NET 5, Netherlands)
 Changing Rooms
 Dating in the Dark
 I Love Money
 Fear Factor (2001–2006; 2011–2012)
 The Big Donor Show
 Star Academy / Fame Academy
 Extreme Makeover: Home Edition
 The Bus
 The Games
 The Farm
 Jerseylicious
 Nice People
 Only Fools on Horses
 There's Something About Miriam
 Gay, Straight or Taken?
 Kid Nation
 Queen Bees
 Estate of Panic
 Southern Belles: Louisville
 Survivor South Africa
 T.I. & Tiny: The Family Hustle
 Love in the Wild
 The Voice

Factual 
 Restoration - Aired 2003, 2004, 2006
 Restoration Home - (2011–2013)

Late night/variety shows 
 Crónicas Marcianas
 Games Uplate Live (2006–2009; ABS-CBN)

Drama 

 Black Mirror (drama/satire)
 The Fall (Crime drama)
 Peaky Blinders (Crime drama)
 Hell on Wheels (Western)
 Benidorm (Comedy)
 Ripper Street (Crime drama)
 Bad Education (Comedy)
 My Mad Fat Diary (Comedy)
 Isidingo (Soapie)
 Graduados (romantic comedy)
 Jonathan Strange & Mr Norrell
 Los exitosos Pells (Comedy)
 Red Widow (crime drama/mystery)

Game shows 

 1 vs. 100
 101 Ways to Leave a Gameshow
 The Winner Is
 20Q
 BrainTeaser
 Break the Bank
 Deal or No Deal
 Divided
 Eliminator
 Fear Factor
 For the Rest of Your Life
 Golden Balls
 Hotrods
 In the Grid
 Judas Game
 Midnight Money Madness
 The Million Pound Drop (quiz show)
 Participation TV
 Pointless
 Set for Life
 Show Me the Money
 Take the Cake
 The Almost Impossible Gameshow
 The Bank Job
 The Brain
 The Wall
 Wipeout / Total Wipeout
 XXS – Extra Extra Small
 Wheel of Fortune

Children's shows 

 The DJ Kat Show
 Gordon the Garden Gnome
 Bananas in Pyjamas
 Nini
 Pig's Breakfast
 Hi-5
 How 2
 The Adventures of Bottle Top Bill and His Best Friend Corky
 Animal Express
 Cushion Kids
 Classic Tales
 Aliens Among Us
 The Shak
 The Tribe
 Dinky Dog
 R.L. Stine's The Haunting Hour
 Total Drama
 Ani Tore! EX 
 I Can Cook

Live TV 
 Domino Day

Sitcoms 
 Hot in Cleveland (International distribution only)
 Happily Divorced (International distribution only)
 The Exes

Talk/Variety
 The Steve Harvey Show
 Katch It With Khanyi

Notes

External links 
 Endemol

 
Banijay
Mass media companies established in 1994
Mass media companies disestablished in 2015
Television production companies of the Netherlands
Pan-European media companies
Television production companies of the United States
Mass media in Amsterdam
1994 establishments in the Netherlands
Former subsidiaries of The Walt Disney Company